Amirabad (also Romanized as Amīrābād; also known as Amīrīyeh) is a village in Takab Rural District, Shahdad District, Kerman County, Kerman Province, Iran. At the 2006 census, its population was 98, in 24 families.

References 

Populated places in Kerman County